Tilak Smarak Ranga Mandir is a theatre auditorium and exhibition hall located in Pune, India. The theatre is dedicated to the noted Indian nationalist and social reformer Bal Gangadhar Tilak. The auditorium has a series of murals, created by Gopal Deuskar, which showcase important events in the life of Tilak.

References

Theatres in Pune
Memorials to Bal Gangadhar Tilak
Auditoriums in India